Qeshlaq Rural District is in Abish Ahmad District of Kaleybar County, East Azerbaijan province, Iran. At the National Census of 2006, its population was 6,468 in 1,320 households. There were 5,250 inhabitants in 1,327 households at the following census of 2011. At the most recent census of 2016, the population of the rural district was 4,933 in 1,431 households. The largest of its 29 villages was Qarah Qayah, with 714 people.

References 

Kaleybar County

Rural Districts of East Azerbaijan Province

Populated places in East Azerbaijan Province

Populated places in Kaleybar County